Benjamin Lucas (born 8 October 1990) is a French politician from Génération.s. He has been Member of Parliament for Yvelines's 8th constituency since 2022.

See also 
 List of deputies of the 16th National Assembly of France

References 

1990 births
Living people
Génération.s politicians
Deputies of the 16th National Assembly of the French Fifth Republic
21st-century French politicians
People from Amiens
Socialist Party (France) politicians
Members of Parliament for Yvelines